Ohaozara is a Local Government Area of Ebonyi State, Nigeria. Its headquarters are in the town of Obiozara Uburu.
It also has other town like Ugwulangwu, and Okposi in the Local Government Area.

The postal code of the area is 491.

The old Ohaozara division includes the present day Ohaozara and Onicha local Govt Areas of Ebonyi State. 
The Ohaozara people speak distinct dialects of the Igboid family for example, 'come here' is 'bia ekaa'.

References

Local Government Areas in Ebonyi State
Populated places in Ebonyi State